The Women's International Champions Cup (WICC) is an annual club women's soccer invitational tournament in the United States. Launched by Relevent Sports Group in 2018, it features four American and European women's soccer teams competing for the championship. As FIFA currently only organises a men's club world championship - the FIFA Club World Cup - the Women's International Champions Cup is the annual decider for the best women's club soccer team in the world.

List of finals

Results by club

Broadcasting
In 2022, the matches of the Women's International Champions Cup were broadcast in more than 175 countries via DAZN and on their YouTube channel.

See also
 The Women's Cup
 UEFA Women's Champions League
 AFC Women's Club Championship
 CAF Women's Champions League
 CAF Women's Champions League

References

External links

 
2018 establishments in the United States
Recurring sporting events established in 2018

pt:Women's International Champions Cup